Ali Abdullahi Hussein (Ali Guudlaawe (born 1974) is Somali politician who has served as the President of Hirshabelle from 12 November 2020.

Biography 
Gudlawe completed his primary and secondary education in Jowhar. Then he received his undergraduate degree from Somali International University. He previously served as the Chief of Finance of the Middle Shabelle Regional Administration, during the Mohamed Dheere Administration from 2001 to 2006. He served as the Deputy Governor of Middle Shabelle during the Transitional Federal Government from 2007 to 2009.

Gudlawe was the governor of Middle Shabelle region in 2014 and 2016 and the interim president of Hirshabelle State in 2017.

In October 2016, he was elected Vice President of Hirshabelle State, presided over newly recruited HirShabelle State Police, and protested the enslavement of Somalis in Libya.

He became the president of Hirshabelle State again in 2020. Of the 99 members of Parliament, 86 were voted for by Ali Gudlawe while 13 others voted for Abdirahman Jimale Osman.

References

Presidents of Hirshabelle
Living people
Ethnic Somali people
1974 births